The Oglesby-Conrad House, located off U.S. Route 60 in Cloverport, Kentucky, was listed on the National Register of Historic Places in 1983.

It is a one-and-a-half-story brick house built c.1825, with brick of front and west facades laid in Flemish bond.  It is notable as a Federal-style brick house.

References

Houses on the National Register of Historic Places in Kentucky
Federal architecture in Kentucky
Houses completed in 1825
National Register of Historic Places in Breckinridge County, Kentucky
1825 establishments in Kentucky